This is a list of township-level divisions of Tibet Autonomous Region (TAR), People's Republic of China (PRC). After province, prefecture, and county-level divisions, township-level divisions constitute the formal fourth-level administrative divisions of the PRC. As of the end of 2014, there are a total of 691 such divisions in TAR, divided into 9 subdistricts, 140 towns, 534 townships, and 8 ethnic townships.

Lhasa

Chengguan District

 Caigungtang Subdistrict, Chabxi Subdistrict, Garmagoinsar Subdistrict, Gündêling Subdistrict, Gyirai Subdistrict, Jêbumgang Subdistrict, Jinzhu West Road Subdistrict, Liangdao Subdistrict, Ngaqên Subdistrict, Nyangrain Subdistrict, Pargor Subdistrict, Togdê Subdistrict

Doilungdêqên District
Subdistricts
 Donggar Subdistrict, Naiqung Subdistrict, Yabda Subdistrict, Liuwu (Niu) Subdistrict

Townships (Xang)
 Dêqên Township, Mar Township, Gurum Township.

Dagzê District
The only town (Chongdai) is Dagzê Town

Townships
 Targyai Township, Zangdog Township, Tanggar Township, Xoi Township, Dromdoi Township.

Damxung County
Towns
 Damquka Town, Yangbajain Town

Townships
 Gyaidar Township, Nyingzhung Township, Gongtang Township, Lungring Township, Wumatang Township, Namco Township.

Lhünzhub County
The only town is Ganden Chökhor (Lhünzhub) Town (()

Townships
 Codoi Township, Karze Township, Qangka Township, Sumchêng Township, Jangraxa Township, Banjorling Township, Pundo Township, Ngarnang Township, Tanggo Township.

Maizhokunggar County
The only town is Kunggar Town

Townships
 Gyama Township, Tanggya Township, Zhaxigeng Township, Nyimajangra Township, Zaxoi Township, Rutog Township, Mamba Township.

Nyêmo County
The only town is Tarrong Town

Townships
 Toinba Township, Xumai Township, Pusum Township, Paggor Township, Margyang Township, Karru Township, Nyêmo Township.

Qüxü County
The only town is Qüxü Town

Townships
 Nyêtang Township, Carbanang Township, Caina Township, Nam Township, Dagar Township.

Qamdo (Chamdo)

Karub District
Towns
 Chengguan Town, Guro Town, Karub Town

Townships
 Momda Township, Sagang Township, Ormaika Township, Ngêxi Township, Ruxi Township, Retong Township, Cêrwai Township, Toba Township, Karma Township, Mainda Township, Yorba Township, Latog Township

Jomda County
Towns
 Jomda Town, Gamtog Town

Townships
 Qongkor Township, Üpäl Township, Kargang Township, Sibda Township, Nyaxi Township, Zigar Township, Qu'nyido Township, Woinbodoi Township, Dêrdoin Township, Tongpu Township, Bolo Township

Gonjo County
The only town is Bolo Town

Townships
 Mindo Township, Zêba Township, Langmai Township, Sêrdong Township, Kêrri Township, Bumgyê Township, Awang Township, Lhato Township, Qangsum Township, Lha'gyai Township, Gyanbê Township

Banbar County
Towns
Banbar Town, Coka Town

Townships
 Mau Township, Rayü Township, Nyinmo Township, Sadêng Township, Jiling Township, Jaggong Township, Marxog Township, Dowa Township, Lhazê Township

Baxoi County
 Baima, Ra'og, Bangda, Tanggar

Townships
 Lingka Township, Gyari Township, Yangpa Township, Wa Township, Gyêda Township, Karwa pêkyim Township, Jirong Township, Yiqên Township, Lagê Township, Korqên Township

Dêngqên County
Towns
 Dêngqên Town, Trido Town
Townships
 Sagang Township, Muta Township, Bota Township, Pada Township, Gangé Township, Gata Township, Sertsa Township, Zhezhung Township, Sado Township, Damdoi Township, Gyang Ngön Township

Lhorong County
Towns
 Dzito Town, Xobando Town, Khangsar Town, Marri Town
Townships
 Yülzhi Township, Shingrong Township, Dakrong Township, Nagchok Township, Ngülshö Township, Kungye Sumdo Township, Pedak Township

Markam County
Towns
 Gartok Town, Rongmé Town

Townships
 Chutsenkha Township, Mokshö Township, Jangpa Miri Township, Chupalung Township, Chörten Township, Jidrong Township, Pangda Township, Göpo Township, Norné Township, Co'nga Township, Gardo Township, Tsangshö Township, Bumpa Township, Zurdeshö Township

Riwoqê County
Towns
 Samdo Town, Riwoqê Town

Townships
 Jigdoi Township, Kangda Township, Pênda Township, Karmardo Township, Samka Township, Qukoido Township, Jagsamka Township, Chamoling Township

Zhag'yab County
Towns
 Yêndum Town, Gyithang Town, Jamdün Town

Townships
 Zangsar Township, Khentang Township, Korra Township, Shingka Township, Wakhar Township, Acur Township, Pelri Township, Rangzhub Township, Kargong Township, Calamdo Township

Zogang County
Towns
 Uyak Town, Temtok Town, Oktang Town

Townships
 Dobbar Township, Zhong Lingka Township, Maiyü Township, Zhalingkha Township, Pütog Township, Rigo Township, Rabchen Township

Xigazê (Shigatse)

Samzhubzê District
Subdistricts
 Chengbei Subdistrict and Chengnan Subdistrict

Townships
 Lhain Township, Nyamo Township, Jangdam Township, Benxung Township, Donggar Township, Nyarixung Township, Gyacoxung Township, Qugboxung Township, Qumig Township, Nar Township.

Bainang County
Towns
 Norbu Khyungtse Town, Gadong Town

Townships
 Pältsel Township, Mak Township, Wangden Township, Qunub Township, Düjung Township, Jangtö Township, Gabug Township, Tashar Township, Tongshé Township.

Dinggyê County
Towns
 Gyangkar Town, Ri'og Town, Chentang Town

Townships
 Gojag Township, Sar Township, Kyungzê Township, Dinggyê Township, Qab Township, Dozhag Township, Tashi Nang Township.

Gamba County
The only town is Gamba Town

Townships
 Lungrong Township, Gurme Township, Chig Township, Changlung Township.

Gyangzê (Gyantse) County
The only town is Gyangzê (Gyantse) Town

Townships
 Naröl Township, Kardoi Township, Karmai Township, Tsangkha Township, Rinang Township, Dagzê Township, Rasog Township, Drongtsé Township, Lungmar Township, Tsechen Township, Jangra Township, Nyangdoi Township, Kangco Township, Gyinkar Township, Rizhing Township, Ralung Township, Charing Township, Jaggyê Township.

Gyirong County
Towns
 Zongga Town, Gyirong Town

Townships
 Zhêba Township, Kungtang Township(), Chagna Township.

Kangmar County
The only town is Kangmar Town

Townships
 Namnying Township, Sapügang Township, Kamru Township, Zhontreng Township, Samada Township, Gala Township, Nyêrudoi Township, Nyêrumai Township.

Lhazê (Lhatse) County
Towns
 Lhazê Town, Quxar Town

Townships
 Tashi Dzom Township, Qoima Township, Püncogling Township, Tashigang Township, Liu Township, Resa Township, Mangpu Township, Xiqên Township, Chau Township.

Namling County
The only town is Namling Town

Townships
 Car Township, Dagna Township, Doqoi Township, Êma Township, Gyamco Township, Karzê Township, Lhabupu Township, Mangra Township, Numa Township, Putang Township, Dakce Township, Qum Township, Ratang Township, Rindü Township, Sogqên Township, Tobgyai Township.

Ngamring County
Towns
 Gegang Town, Sangsang Town

Townships
 Yagmo Township, Dagyu Township, Qu'og Township, Kairag Township, Dobê Township, Riwoqê Township, Xungba Township, Cazê Township, Amxung Township, Rusar Township, Kunglung Township, Nyigo Township, Comë Township, Darog Township, Goin'gyibug Township.

Nyalam County
Towns
 Nyalam Town, Dram Town

Townships
 Yarlêb Township, Zurco Township,  Nailung Township, Mainpu Township, Borong Township.

Rinbung County
The only town is Dê'gyiling Town

Townships
 Chagba Township, Kangxung Township, Moin Township, Bartang Township, Pusum Township, Qewa Township, Ramba Township, Rinbung Township.

Sa'gya County
Towns
 Sa'gya Town, Gêding Town

Townships
 Xungmai Township, Maja Township, Zhungma Township, Tashigang Township, Chagjug Township, Së Township, Lalho Township, Drag'rong Township, Molha Township.

Saga County
The only town is Gya'gya Town

Townships
 Changgo Township, Xungru Township, Lhagcang Township, Ru’gyog Township, Targyailing Township, Dênggar Township, Xarru Township.

Tingri County
Towns
 Shelkar Town, Gangga Town

Townships
 Qutang Township, Tashi Dzom Township, Kaimar Township, Ronxar Township, Cogo Township, Qulho Township, Chamco Township, Nyixar Township, Zagor Township, Pain'gyi Township, Gyaco Township.

Xaitongmoin County
The only town is Chabkha Town

Townships
 Tongmoin Township, Rungma Township, Tarding Township, Danagpu Township, Namoqê Township, Ringqênzê Township, Dagmoxar Township, Mübaqêqên Township, Qingtü Township, Qêqung Township, Nartang Township, Tsozhi Township, Nyangra Township, Zêxong Township, Chuzhig Township, Capu Township, Danagda Township, Lêba Township.

Yadong (Dromo) County
Towns
 Xarsingma Town, Pagri Town

Townships
 Gêrru Township, Gambu Township, Rübunggang Township, Düna Township, Down Dromo Township.

Zhongba County
The only town is Baryang Town

Townships
 Labrang Township, Bodoi Township, Gêla Township, Gyêma Township, Horpa Township, Lunggar Township, Nagqu Township, Penchi Township, Barma Township, Qonkor Township, Rintor Township, Yagra Township.

Nyingchi

Bayi District
Towns
 Bayi Town, Nyingchi Town, Bêba Town, Lunang Town

Townships
 Güncang Township, Puqu Township, Mairi Township.

Bomê County
Towns
 Zhamo Town, Chumdo Town, Sumzom Town

Townships
 Gu Township, Shulmo Township, Dorjé Township, Kangyul Township, Yupuk Township, Yi'ong Township, Paggai Township.

Gongbo'gyamda County
Towns
 Gongbo'gyamda Town, Chimda Town, Zhoka Town

Townships
 Tsongo Township, Drug la Township, Drongsar Township, Gyamda Township, Nyangpo Township, Gyashing Township.

Mainling County
Towns
 Mainling Town, Orong Town, Pé Town

Townships
 Tamnyen Township, Naiyü Township, Chanak Township, Nelung Township, Tashi Rabten Township.

Mêdog County
 Metok Town

Townships
 Drepung Township, Dezhing Township, Takmo Township, Bangxing Township, Jarasa Township, Ganden Township, Gutang Township.

Nang County
Towns
 Nang Town, Dromda Town, Dungkar Town

Townships
 Kyemtong Township, Latok Township, Dem Township.

Zayü County
Towns
 Drowagön Town, Shangzayü Town, Xiazayü Town.

Townships
 Goyü Township, Gola Township, Cawarong Township.

Shannan (Lhoka)

Nêdong District
Towns
 Tsetang, Thradrug

Townships
  Pozhang Township, Kerpa Township, Dopozhang Township, Sodruk Township, Yadoi Township

Comai County
Towns
 Comai Town, Drigu Town

Townships
  Naixi Township, Godü Township

Cona County
Towns
 Cona Town

Townships
 Lai Township, Kongri Township, Gyiba Township, Marmang Township, Kaqu Township, Qudromo Township, Lampug Township, Jorra Township, Kardak Township

Gonggar County
Towns
  Kyishong Town, Göntö Town, Gyadrukling Town, Qangtang Town, Chede Zhöl Town

Township
 Namgyel Zhöl Township, Chênggo Township, Dongra Township

Gyaca County
Towns
 Gyaca Town, Ngarrab Town

Townships
 Lhasöl Township, Chêju Township, Ba Township, Lingda Township, Lholing Township

Lhozhag County
Towns
 Lhozhag Town, Lhakang Town

Townships
 Sengge Township, Benpa Township, Zara Township, Se Township, La'gyab Township

Lhünzê County
Towns
 Lhünzê Town, Ritang Town

Townships
 Jayül Township, Nyaimai Township, Rirong Township, Sangngagqoiling Township, Drönpa Township, Doyü Township, Zhölsar Township, Zara Township, Yümai Township

Nagarzê County
Towns
 Nagarzê Town, Daglung Town

Townships
 Puma Jangtang Township, Doqoi Township, Karlung Township, Ngardrak Township, Lhülpozhöl Township, Karrêg Township, Baidi Township, Chamda Township

Qonggyai County
Qonggyai Town

Townships
 Lhayül Township, Sharsü Township, Gyemen Township

Qusum County
Towns
 Qusum Town, Lababsa Town

Townships
 Qundo'gyang Township, Tözik Township, Shakjang Township

Sangri County
Sangri Town

Townships
 Zingqi Township, Bötö Township, Rong Township

Zhanang County
Towns
 Dratang Town, Samye Town

Townships
 Ngadra Township, Drachi Township, Gyiru Township

Nagqu

Seni District
Towns
 Nagqu Town, Lhomar Town, Golug Town

Townships
 Shamong Township, Yöchak Township, Namarche Township, Kormang Township, Taksar Township, Lumé Township, Serzhong Township, Nyima Township, Daqên Township.

Amdo County
Towns
 Zharen Town, Yanshiping Town, Qangma Town, Pana Town

Townships
 Cuoma Township, Dardü Township, Sibnak Chenchungo Township, Gangnyi Township, Marchu Township, Sewu Township, Marrong Township, Töma Township, Bangmer Township.

Baingoin County
Towns
 Phukpa Town, Bella Town, Jakhyung Town, Dechen Town

Townships
 Machen Township, Mentang Township, Poche Township, Qinglung Township, Shikhyer Township, Nyima Township.

Baqên County
Towns
 Lhashé Town, Ya'nga Town, Dzasib Town

Townships
 Mamta Township, Gangchen Township, Baqên Township, Arshok Township, Marru Township, Bönta Township, Gangri Township.

Biru County
Towns
 Biru Town, Shachu Town

Townships
 Benkar Township, Yangshok Township, Shamchu Township, Dawatang Township, Lenchu Township, Tsachu Township, Zala Township, Qagzê Township.

Lhari County
Towns
 Arza Town, Lhari Town

Townships
 Kochung Township, Dzabbel Township, Drongyül Township, Codoi Township, Tsora Township, Lingti Township, Xarma Township, Rongtö Township.

Nyainrong County
 Nyainrong Town

Townships
 Nyima Township, Chadam Township, Damshung Township, Yongchu Township, Sokzhung Township, Bezhung Township, Trolung Township, Shakchu Township, Serchen Township.

Nyima County
 Nyima Town

Townships
 Ombu Township, Drongtsang Township, Drowa Township, Dro'nyin Township, Kyelwa Township, Gyagok Township, Aso Township, Ngochu Township, Rongma Township, Targo Township, Sin'ya Township, Latö Township, Kyungtsang Township.

Sog County
Towns
 Yakla Town, Rongpo Town

Townships
 Drogta Township, Riwar Township, Sertam Township, Karmo Township, Thrido Township, Garmé Township, Gyälchen Township, Chakda Township.

Shuanghu (Conyi) County
 Codrel Lhoma Town

Townships
 Tsodrel Jangma Township, Zhide Township, Barling Township, Domar Township, Yachu Township, Garco Township.

Xainza County
Towns
 Xainza Town, Xiongmei Town

Townships
 Mar'yo Township, Mepa Township, Tarma Township, Zhago Township, Khyak Township, Patra Township.

Ngari Prefecture

Gar County
The only town is Sênggêzangbo (Shiquanhe) Town

Townships
 Günsa Township, Moincêr Township, Zhaxigang Township and Zoco Township.

Burang County
The only town is Burang Town

Townships
 Hor Township, Baga Township.

Coqên County
The only town is Coqên Town

Townships
 Chulho Township, Gyangrang Township, Dawaxung Township, Cêri Township.

Gê'gyai County
The only town is Gê'gyai Town

Townships
 Zhungpa Township, Yagra Township, Yanhu Township, Wönpo tamzang Township.

Gêrzê County
The only town is Gêrzê Town

Townships
 Chabug Township, Dongco Township, Gomo Township, Marmê Township, Oma Township and Shenchen Township.

Rutog County
The only town is Rutog Town

Townships
 Tungru Township, Domar Township, Risong Township, Rabang Township.

Zanda County
The only town is Thoding Town

Townships
 Daba Township, Diyag Township, Chumuti Township, Dzarong Township, Qangzê Township, Tsosib Sumkyil Township.

References

External links
Population by township at Citypopulation.de

 
Tibet
.Townships
Townships